The 2000 Atlantic 10 men's basketball tournament was played from March 8 to March 11, 2000. The tournament was played at The Spectrum in Philadelphia, Pennsylvania.  The winner was named champion of the Atlantic 10 Conference and received an automatic bid to the 2000 NCAA Men's Division I Basketball Tournament. The top two teams in each division received a first-round bye in the conference tournament. Temple University won the tournament. Dayton and St. Bonaventure also received bids to the NCAA Tournament. Quincy Wadley of Temple was named the tournament's Most Outstanding Player. Future NBA players Mark Karcher and Pepe Sánchez of Temple were among those joining Wadley on the All-Championship Team.

Bracket

All games played at The Spectrum, Philadelphia, Pennsylvania* - Overtime

Atlantic 10 men's basketball tournament
Tournament
Atlantic 10 men's basketball tournament
Atlantic 10 men's basketball tournament